Oestrum may refer to:

 Oestrum or Estrum, a phase in the estrous cycle
 , a district of Duisburg, in North Rhine-Westphalia, Germany
 Östrum, a village in Lower Saxony, Germany

See also
 Ostrum (disambiguation)
 Ostrom (disambiguation)
 Eestrum (or Jistrum), a village in the Netherlands